The 2013–14 season Lokomotiv Moscow's was 12th season in the Russian Premier League, and their 22nd consecutive season in the top-flight of the Russian football championship since the dissolution of the Soviet Union.

This is Leonid Kuchuk's first season in charge after taking over from Slaven Bilić, who was sacked at the end of the previous season following Lokomotiv's worst ever performance in the Russian Premier League since the dissolution of the Soviet Union. Indeed, Lokomotiv's poor performance last season has left the club without European football this season and therefore the only cup that Lokomotiv participates in is the Russian Cup.

Squad and coaching staff information

First team squad
Players and squad numbers last updated on 18 February 2014.Note: Flags indicate national team as has been defined under FIFA eligibility rules. Players may hold more than one non-FIFA nationality.

Youth squad
Statistics updated 14 May 2014

|-----
! colspan="9" bgcolor="#B0D3FB" align="left" |
|----- bgcolor="#DFEDFD"

|-----
! colspan="9" bgcolor="#B0D3FB" align="left" |
|----- bgcolor="#DFEDFD"

|-----
! colspan="9" bgcolor="#B0D3FB" align="left" |
|----- bgcolor="#DFEDFD"

Non-playing staff
Coaches and respective roles last updated on 27 July 2013.

|}

Transfers and loans

In: Summer transfer window 2013

In: Winter transfer window 2014

Out: Summer transfer window 2013

Out: Winter transfer window 2014

Pre-season and mid-season

Lokomotiv's players who were not on duty with their respective national teams called for pre-season medical examinations on Friday 14 June 2013. The others undertook their medical examinations the week after and by 22 June all the players had passed their medical examinations.

On 24 June 2013, the squad, under the guidance of Leonid Kuchuk, flew to Slovenia for the annual pre-season training camp and played a series of friendlies with various clubs.

Pre-season friendlies

One-month vacations after first half of the season ended on 9 January 2014. Players passed medicals and the next day flew to their first winter camp in Portugal. After two weeks of work and two friendlies the team returned to Moscow. The second winter camp, featuring three friendlies, started in Spain on 27 January, and the third camp with five control matches – also in Spain, from 14 February.

Mid-season friendlies

Competitions

Russian Premier League

Results by matchday

Results

Table

Russian Cup

Youth squads tournament

Results by matchday

Squad statistics
Last update 16 May 2014

Lokomotiv players at 2014 FIFA World Cup

Lokomotiv players in Russian national teams

Russia first team

Defender Maksim Belyayev,midfielders Aleksei Miranchuk, Aleksandr Samedov, Dmitri Tarasov, Maksim Grigoryev.

Student team

Midfielder Alan Chochiyev.

Youth team U-21

Goalkeeper Miroslav Lobantsev,midfielder Aleksei Miranchuk.

1995 U-19

Goalkeeper Miroslav Lobantsev,defenders Vitali Lystsov, Oleg Murachyov, Temur Mustafin,midfielders Dmitri Barinov, Andrei Chernetsov, Aleksandr Lomakin, Anton Miranchuk,forwards Arshak Koryan, Aleksei Turik, Andrea Chukanov.

1996 U-17/U-18

Midfielders Dmitri Barinov, Sergei Makarov,forwards Denis Anisimov,
Rifat Zhemaletdinov.

1997 U-17

Goalkeeper Ilya Ishchenko,defender Dzhamshed Rakhmonov,midfielders Nikolai Kipiani, Sergei Serchenkov, Georgi Makhatadze,forward Timur Koblov.

1998 U-16

Goalkeeper Ilya Gnezdilov,defenders Aleksandr Razoryonov, Viktor Fereferov, Yevgeni Fetisov,midfielders Ivan Galanin, Georgi Makhatadze,forwards Artyom Galadzhan, Mikhail Lysov.

1999 U-15

Midfielder Maksim Kalachevski.

Season events

Manager of the Month
In August 2013, after winning all 3 games of the month (Krasnodar and Rostov at home, Terek away), Leonid Kuchuk was awarded monthly prize for Manager of the Month by Russian Football Union.

Manager of the Year
In December 2013, after guiding Lokomotiv to the joint leadership in Premier League before winter break, Leonid Kuchuk was named Manager of the Year by Football Federation of Belarus.

Player of the Month
In the 2013–14 season, the club continued a monthly poll among Loko fans in the social networks to name the best player of the month. The award went to:
Guilherme (July 2013),
Vitaliy Denisov (August 2013 and May 2014),
Dmitri Tarasov (September 2013),
Dame N'Doye (October 2013),
Lassana Diarra (November 2013 and December 2013),
Vedran Ćorluka (March 2014),
Aleksandr Samedov (April 2014).

Player of the Season
After the end of 2013–14 season, the club organized a new poll among Loko fans in the social networks to name the best player of the season. The award went to Aleksandr Samedov (32.3 percent of votes), Vedran Ćorluka (21.1) came second, and Vitaliy Denisov (12.5) third.

Player of the Year
In December 2013, Vitaliy Denisov was named Uzbekistani Player of the Year.

Miscellaneous
 Second goal by Dame N'Doye scored 3 November 2013 vs Spartak Moscow became 1000th Lokomotiv's goal in Russian top division since 1992.
 After victory over Kuban Krasnodar on 2 December 2013, Lokomotiv became leader of Premier League for the first time in more than seven years; last time the team led the League in October 2006 after 22 matchdays under guidance of Slavoljub Muslin.
 Ján Ďurica played all 30 league matches and did not miss a single minute. He became the first outfield player to achieve such mark for Lokomotiv during the Russian Premier League time (since 2001) and the third one among all Lokomotiv players after goalkeepers Sergei Ovchinnikov in 2002 and Guilherme in 2010.

References

FC Lokomotiv Moscow seasons
Lokomotiv Moscow